Henryk Wawrowski (born 25 September 1949 in Szczecin, Poland) is a former international Polish footballer who played as a defender. Most of his career he played in Polish clubs, but for short periods he also featured in foreign competitions.

International career
Wawrowski played 25 times for his home country, and he won the silver medal with the Polish Olympic team at the 1976 Summer Olympics, at which he featured in all five games of Poland.

Honours

Olympic
 Silver medal (1): 1976

References

External links
 

1949 births
Living people
Polish footballers
Poland international footballers
Footballers at the 1976 Summer Olympics
Olympic footballers of Poland
Olympic silver medalists for Poland
Olympic medalists in football
Gwardia Warsaw players
Pogoń Szczecin players
Iraklis Thessaloniki F.C. players
Esbjerg fB players
Sportspeople from Szczecin
Medalists at the 1976 Summer Olympics
Association football defenders